Araeopaschia normalis is a species of snout moth in the genus Araeopaschia. It was described by George Hampson in 1906 and is known from Australia.

References

Moths described in 1906
Epipaschiinae
Moths of Australia